Anna Dowgiert (born 1990) is a Polish swimmer. She was born in Białystok. She competed at the 2012 Summer Olympics in London, in the 50 m freestyle, and at the 2016 Summer Olympics, in the 50 m freestyle and the 4 x 100 m freestyle relay.

References

1990 births
Living people
Sportspeople from Białystok
Polish female freestyle swimmers
Olympic swimmers of Poland
Swimmers at the 2012 Summer Olympics
Swimmers at the 2016 Summer Olympics
20th-century Polish women
21st-century Polish women